Falling Flowers is a 2012 Chinese biographical drama film directed by Huo Jianqi and written by Yi Fuhai and Su Xiaowei. It stars Song Jia, Huang Jue, Jaco Zhang, and Wang Renjun. The film premiered at the 2012 Shanghai International Film Festival, and released in China on March 8, 2013.

Cast
 Song Jia as Xiao Hong, a Chinese writer from Hulan county, Heilongjiang Province.
 Wang Xinyi as Little Xiao Hong.
 Huang Jue as Xiao Jun, Xiao Hong's husband.
 Jaco Zhang as Luo Binji, a Chinese writer, Xiao Hong's friend.
 Wang Renjun as Duanmu Hongliang, Xiao Hong's best friend and lover.
 Wu Chao as Mr. Wang
 Li Yiling as Sister
 Mi Zi'an as A Xu
 Sun Weimin as Lu Xun.
 Zhang Tong as Xu Guangping, Lu Xun's husband.
 Teddy as Ni Dalu
 Lu Siyuan as Shu Qun
 Zhang Weizhi as Xiao Hong's father.
 Yang Liping as Xiao Hong's stepmother.
 Li Hancheng as Grandfather.

Production
On August 4, 2011, in the Great Hall of the People, the China Film Group Corporation announced that Wang Luodan had joined the cast as Xiao Hong, but Wang was too busy, she refused to accept the role. On January 4, 2012, Song Jia was cast as Xiao Hong.

Filming took place in Beijing, Shanghai, Harbin, Shenyang, Jilin, Wuhan, Chongqing, and Hong Kong.

Release
The film premiered in Beijing on May 24, 2012 with wide-release in China on the International Women's Day.

In spite of the praise for the lead actress Song Jia's performance as Xiao Hong, the film received generally mix reviews.  The Hollywood Reporter describes the film as "highly poetic, but lacks drama and warmth."

Accolades

References

External links

 Falling Flowers Sina

2012 biographical drama films
2012 films
Biographical films about writers
Chinese biographical drama films
Films directed by Huo Jianqi
Films shot in Beijing
Films shot in Chongqing
Films shot in Heilongjiang
Films shot in Hong Kong
Films shot in Hubei
Films shot in Jilin
Films shot in Liaoning
Films shot in Shanghai
Films with screenplays by Si Wu
2012 drama films
Xiao Hong